Immediate early response 3-interacting protein 1 is a protein that in humans is encoded by the IER3IP1 gene.

References

Further reading